Anatoli Vasiliyevich Kertoake (born 26 October 1964) is a Russian former football midfielder and manager. He is the manager of FC Dynamo Vologda.

Club career
He played for such clubs as FC Dynamo Kirov, FC Elektron Vyatskiye Polyany, FC Lokomotiv Kirov.

Coaching career
On July 5, 2021, he was appointed head coach of FC Znamya Noginsk.

In the summer of 2022, he was formally appointed head coach of FC Dynamo Vologda due to the lack of the necessary license from Rudolf Chesalov.

References

External links
 

1964 births
Living people
Russian footballers
Association football midfielders
Association football managers
FC Dynamo Kirov players